Gary Muller (born 27 December 1964) is a former professional South African tennis player.

Muller turned pro in 1985. His 12-year career included wins over Andre Agassi, Jim Courier, Michael Chang and Stefan Edberg. Muller's best singles result at a Grand Slam was reaching the third round in the 1987 Australian Open in which he lost to Miloslav Mečíř of Czechoslovakia. A more successful doubles player than singles, Muller won eight doubles titles in his career with six different partners and reached a career highest ranking of 7th in November 1993. He reached the semi-final of the men's doubles at four Grand Slams (1986 US Open, 1988 Wimbledon, 1990 Australian Open and 1993 Wimbledon). Muller still holds the record for the most aces served in a three set match (54) in a 1993 Wimbledon Qualifying match against Peter Lundgren.

After his retirement in 1997 Muller worked for eight years as an ATP Tour coach during which time he worked with Jonas Björkman, Stefan Koubek, Sargis Sargsian and Thomas Johansson. He was with Dominic Thiem as his Touring Coach when he clinched the title in Rio in 2017.

Muller was on the ATP Board of Directors as a Player Representative from 2002 to 2004.

He currently resides in Ontario, Canada with his wife and four children.

Career finals

Doubles (8 wins, 12 losses)

References

External links
 
 
 
 "Muller Gains in Tennis" at the New York Times
Gary Muller's website: www.refusetomiss.com

1964 births
Living people
Afrikaner people
South African people of German descent
Sportspeople from Durban
South African male tennis players